Selim Teber (born 7 March 1981) is a German former professional footballer who played as a midfielder.

Career
Teber was a member of the 1899 Hoffenheim team that won promotion to the 2. Bundesliga.

In July 2009 Teber left Hoffenheim and signed on 30 June 2009 a contract with Eintracht Frankfurt. In the summer of 2010 Selim Teber signed for Kayserispor. Teber can also play as a striker.

In September 2013, he joined MKE Ankaragücü on a two-year contract which was then terminated early on 16 October 2014.

Personal life
Teber is married and has one daughter.

References

External links
 
  
 

1981 births
Living people
German people of Turkish descent
German footballers
Turkish footballers
Association football midfielders
Germany under-21 international footballers
Germany youth international footballers
Bundesliga players
2. Bundesliga players
Süper Lig players
Austrian Football Bundesliga players
1. FC Kaiserslautern II players
1. FC Kaiserslautern players
FC Red Bull Salzburg players
TSG 1899 Hoffenheim players
Eintracht Frankfurt players
Kayserispor footballers
Samsunspor footballers
MKE Ankaragücü footballers
German expatriate footballers
German expatriate sportspeople in Austria
Expatriate footballers in Austria
People from Frankenthal
Footballers from Rhineland-Palatinate
VfR Frankenthal players